In addition to the Beatles' films A Hard Day's Night (1964), Help! (1965), Magical Mystery Tour (1967), Yellow Submarine (1968) and Let It Be (1970), Ringo Starr also acted in films such as Candy (1968), The Magic Christian (1969, alongside Peter Sellers), Blindman (1971), Son of Dracula (1974) and Caveman (1981).
Starr directed and appeared in Born to Boogie (1972), a concert film featuring Marc Bolan and T. Rex. For the 1979 documentary film on the Who, The Kids Are Alright, Starr appeared in interview segments with fellow drummer Keith Moon. He starred as Larry the Dwarf in Frank Zappa's 200 Motels (1971). His voice is also featured in Harry Nilsson's animated film The Point! (1971).

In 1972, Starr made a brief cameo appearance at the end of an episode of Monty Python's Flying Circus, entitled "Mr. and Mrs. Brian Norris' Ford Popular". He co-starred in That'll Be the Day (1973) as a Teddy Boy,  and went on to appear in The Last Waltz, the Martin Scorsese film about the 1976 farewell concert of the Band, a favourite of the Beatles. Starr played 'The Pope' in Ken Russell's Lisztomania (1975),  and a fictionalised version of himself in Paul McCartney's Give My Regards to Broad Street in 1984. He also appeared as himself, and downtrodden alter-ego Ognir Rrats, in Ringo (1978), an American-made television comedy film based loosely on The Prince and the Pauper.

Starr was the first narrator of the children's programme Thomas the Tank Engine & Friends from 1984–86 for the British broadcast and from 1984–90 in the United States.

Filmography 

The Beatles Come to Town (1963) (short subject) – with the Beatles
A Hard Day's Night (1964) – with the Beatles
Help! (1965) – with the Beatles
Reflections on Love (1966) (short subject)
Magical Mystery Tour (1967) – with the Beatles
The Beatles Mod Odyssey (1968) (short subject) – with the Beatles
Yellow Submarine (1968) – with the Beatles
Candy (1968)
The Magic Christian (1969)
Let It Be (1970) (documentary) – with the Beatles (Winner of the Academy Award for Best Song Score)
Music! (1971) (documentary)
200 Motels (1971)
Blindman (1971)
The Point! (1971) (Narrator on Home Video release)
Did Somebody Drop His Mouse? (1972) (short subject)
The Concert for Bangladesh (1972) (documentary)
Born to Boogie (1972) (documentary) (also director)
That'll Be the Day (1973)
Ziggy Stardust and the Spiders from Mars (1973) (documentary)
Son of Dracula (1974)
Lisztomania (1975)
The Day the Music Died (1977) (documentary)
The Beatles and Beyond (1977) (documentary)
Sextette (1978)

Ringo (1978) (TV film)
The Last Waltz (1978) (documentary)
The Kids Are Alright (1979) (documentary)
Caveman (1981)
The Cooler (1982) (short subject)
Princess Daisy (1983) (TV Movie) w/Barbara Bach
Give My Regards to Broad Street (1984)
Thomas & Friends (1984–1986) (UK/US Narrator: Series 1–2)
Water (1985) (cameo)
Alice in Wonderland (1985)
Sun City/The Making of Sun City (1986) (documentary)
Queen: The Magic Years (1987) (documentary)
Walking After Midnight (1988) (documentary)
The Return of Bruno (1988)
Shining Time Station (1989–1990) (Mr. Conductor/Narrator)
The Simpsons (1991) episode Brush with Greatness
Shelley Duvall's Bedtime Stories (1992) episode Elbert's Bad Word; Weird Parents
The Beatles Anthology (1995) (documentary) – with the Beatles
Concert for George (2003) (documentary)
Oh My God (2009) (documentary)
George Harrison: Living in the Material World (2011) (documentary)
The Powerpuff Girls: Dance Pantsed (2014) Fibonacci Sequins (voice)
Popstar: Never Stop Never Stopping (2016) (himself)
The Beatles: Get Back (2021) (himself) (documentary)

Citations

Sources

Further reading 

 
 
 
 
 
 
 
 
 
 
 
 
 

 
Male actor filmographies
British filmographies